Ojuelo is a river of the Province of Albacete, Spain, in the upper reaches of the Guadiana drainage basin. It flows for circa  into the Córcoles River where it passes under the N-430 highway, and has its source near El Bonillo.

References

Rivers of Spain
Rivers of the Province of Albacete
Rivers of Castilla–La Mancha
Tributaries of the Guadiana River